Aerodactylus (meaning "wind finger") is a pterosaur genus containing a single species, Aerodactylus scolopaciceps, previously regarded as a species of Pterodactylus.

The fossil remains of this species have been found only in the Solnhofen limestone of Bavaria, Germany, dated to the late Jurassic Period (early Tithonian), about 150.8–148.5 million years ago. Like all pterosaurs, the wings of Aerodactylus were formed by a skin and muscle membrane stretching from its elongated fourth finger to its hind limbs. It was supported internally by collagen fibres and externally by keratinous ridges. Several well preserved fossils have shown that Aerodactylus was covered in a short, dense coat of bristly pycnofibres, and that it had a rounded triangular crest on its head, as well as a backward-pointing lappet. It is named after the pterosaur-like Pokémon Aerodactyl. The validity of Aerodactylus has been disputed, with some pterosaur experts suggesting that none of the specimens referred to this genus are distinguishable from Pterodactylus.

Description

Aerodactylus is known from six fossil specimens, and though all of them are juveniles, all preserve complete skeletons. The discovery of several specimens with well-preserved soft tissue traces has allowed scientists to faithfully reconstruct the life appearance of Aerodactylus.

The skulls of Aerodactylus were long and narrow with about 64 teeth which were more crowded towards the jaw tips. The teeth extended back from the tips of both jaws, and the tooth row ended before the front of the nasoantorbital fenestra, the largest opening in the skull. Unlike some related species, the skull and upper jaw was curved slightly upward, not straight. A small, hooked beak was present in the very tips of the jaws, with both upper and lower hook no larger than the teeth that surrounded them.

The neck was long, and covered in long, bristle-like pycnofibres. A throat pouch extended from about the middle of the lower jaw to the upper part of the neck.

Aerodactylus, like related pterosaurs, had a crest on its skull composed mainly of soft tissues along the top of the skull. One specimen (MCZ 1505, the counter slab of BSP 1883 XVI 1) shows a roughly triangular soft tissue crest extending upward above the posterior half of the naso-antorbital fenestra and the eye; the crest was 44 to 51 mm long (around 38 to 45% of the total length of the skull) and reached a maximum height of 9,5 mm.

Bennett (2013) noted that other authors claimed that the soft tissue crest of Pterodactylus extended backward behind the skull; Bennett himself, however, didn't find any evidence for the crest extending past the back of the skull. The back of the skull bore a small crest or "lappet" which pointed backward in a cone-shaped structure. The lappet was composed mainly of long, stiffened fibres twisted together in a spiral pattern inside a conical sheath of soft tissue.

The wings were long, and the wing membranes appear to have lacked the furry covering of pycnofibres present in some other pterosaurs (such as Pterorhynchus and Jeholopterus). The wing membrane extended between the fingers and toes as webbing, and a uropatagium (secondary membrane between the feet and tail) was present, as well as a propatagium (membrane between the wrist and shoulder). Both the finger and toe claws were covered in keratin sheaths that extended and curved into sharp hooks well beyond their bony cores.

History and disputed status

In 1850 Hermann von Meyer described the specimen now known by its collection number BSP AS V 29 a/b as a new specimen of Pterodactylus longirostris. Pterodactylus longirostris is a junior synonym of Ornithocephalus antiquus, but Pterodactylus replaced Ornithocephalus through popular use. The specimen BSP AS V 29 a/b was discussed again in Meyer's Fauna der Vorwelt (1860), this time under the name Pterodactylus scolopaciceps. Both Zittel and Wagner took exception to Meyer's new species and it was synonymized with P. kochi in 1883. Broili described a second specimen and used the name P. scolopaciceps, confident that it was a valid species. However, the name slipped into obscurity and Wellnhofer considered it a junior synonym of P. kochi. In 2013 P. kochi was reviewed by Bennet and synonymised with P. antiquus. Vidovic and Martill disagreed with the findings of Bennett and considered the content of P. kochi to be paraphyletic. When Vidovic and Martill separated P. scolopaciceps from P. kochi they considered it so distinct they gave it the genus name Aerodactylus, formed from the Greek words for "wind finger", but chosen in reference to the Pokémon Aerodactyl, which was based on an amalgamation of different pterosaurian features.

In 2018 pterosaur researcher Christopher Bennett challenged the status of Aerodactylus on several grounds: 1) that the alleged skull features are only trivially different from those seen in Pterodactylus; 2) that the specimens referred to Aerodactylus have an unusual growth regime compared to other Solnhofen pterodactyloids, suggesting that Vidovic and Martill had grouped an unnatural assemblage of specimens; and 3) that no evidence had been presented to rule out effects of preservation or individual variation on the slight differences between Aerodactylus and Pterodactylus. Bennett concluded that Aerodactylus scolopaciceps is a junior synonym of Pterodactylus antiquus.

See also
 Timeline of pterosaur research

References

Late Jurassic pterosaurs of Europe
Ctenochasmatoids
Solnhofen fauna
Fossil taxa described in 2014